Rahonem (c. 2500 B.C.) was an Egyptian musician. She was the director of the female singers and tabour (drum) players in her temple.

Throughout Egyptian history, women participated to the fullest extent in the religious ceremony and in the music accompanying it. Many Egyptian women musicians were trained for the service in the temples and also were expected to use music upon other occasions apart from the temple ceremony. Women who lived in the palaces performed using the same musical ideas and idioms that were used in religious ritual. Rahonem was both the chief woman manager of the lesser wives and director of the female musical performers. She has the same title as that given to the priestess-musician.

See also
List of women in the Heritage Floor

References

3rd-millennium BC births
3rd-millennium BC deaths
Ancient Egyptian priestesses
Ancient singers
Ancient musicians